Zug Schutzengel railway station is a railway station in the municipality of Zug, in the Swiss canton of Zug. It is an intermediate stop on the standard gauge Zug–Lucerne and Zürich–Zug lines of Swiss Federal Railways, although no trains on the latter stop here.

Services 
The following services stop at Zug Schutzengel:

References

External links 
 
 

Railway stations in the canton of Zug
Swiss Federal Railways stations